San Antonio is a city in the north-eastern region of Misiones Province, Argentina, and the capital of the General Manuel Belgrano Department. Its population was 3,665 at the 2010 census (INDEC).

The municipality contains part of the  Urugua-í Provincial Park, created in 1990.

References

Populated places in Misiones Province
Populated places established in 1951